Tenmile is an unincorporated community in Upshur County, West Virginia, United States.

The community took its name from nearby Tenmile Creek.

References 

Unincorporated communities in West Virginia
Unincorporated communities in Upshur County, West Virginia